This article lists the most notable Romantic poets.

England 

The six best-known English male authors are, in order of birth and with an example of their work:
 William Blake – The Marriage of Heaven and Hell
 William Wordsworth – The Prelude
 Samuel Taylor Coleridge – The Rime of the Ancient Mariner
 George Gordon, Lord Byron – Don Juan, "Childe Harold's Pilgrimage"
 Percy Bysshe Shelley – Prometheus Unbound, "Adonaïs", "Ode to the West Wind", "Ozymandias"
 John Keats – Great Odes, "Hyperion", "Endymion"

Notable female poets include:
 Felicia Dorothea Hemans 
 Anna Laetitia Barbauld 
 Charlotte Smith 
 Mary Robinson 
 Hannah More 
 Joanna Baillie

Major Romantic poets across the world
Albania: Jeronim de Rada, Naim Frashëri
Brazil: Álvares de Azevedo, Castro Alves, Casimiro de Abreu, Gonçalves Dias, Fagundes Varela, Junqueira Freire, Gonçalves de Magalhães
Bulgaria: Hristo Botev
Croatia: Petar Preradović
Czech Republic: Karel Hynek Macha
Denmark: N. F. S. Grundtvig, Adam Oehlenschläger, Hans Christian Andersen
France: Marceline Desbordes-Valmore, Alphonse de Lamartine, Alfred de Vigny, Victor Hugo, Aloysius Bertrand, Gérard de Nerval, Théophile Gautier, Alfred de Musset, Charles Baudelaire
Georgia: Alexander Chavchavadze, Nikoloz Baratashvili, Grigol Orbeliani
Germany: Heinrich Heine, Johann Wolfgang von Goethe, Friedrich Schiller, Novalis, Friedrich Hölderlin, E. T. A. Hoffmann, Clemens Brentano, Joseph Freiherr von Eichendorff, Achim von Arnim
Hungary: Sándor Petőfi
India: Michael Madhusudan Dutt, Rabindranath Tagore, Satyendranath Dutta, Kazi Nazrul Islam, Jibanananda Das, Jaishankar Prasad, Suryakant Tripathi, Sumitranandan Pant, Mahadevi Verma
Italy: Giacomo Leopardi, Ugo Foscolo, Alessandro Manzoni, Vittorio Alfieri
Montenegro: Petar II Petrović Njegoš
Poland: Three Bards (Adam Mickiewicz, Juliusz Słowacki, Zygmunt Krasiński), Cyprian Kamil Norwid
Portugal: Alexandre Herculano, Almeida Garrett, António Feliciano de Castilho
Romania: Ion Heliade Radulescu, Dimitrie Bolintineanu, Vasile Alecsandri, Mihai Eminescu
Russia: Golden Age of Russian Poetry – Aleksandr Pushkin, Mikhail Lermontov, Fyodor Tyutchev, Evgeny Baratynsky, Vasily Zhukovsky, Konstantin Batyushkov
Serbia: Branko Radičević, Đura Jakšić, Laza Kostić, Jovan Jovanović Zmaj
Slovakia: Janko Kráľ
Slovenia: France Prešeren
Spain: Gustavo Adolfo Becquer, José de Espronceda, Rosalía de Castro, José Zorrilla, Jacint Verdaguer
Ukraine: Taras Shevchenko
United States: Henry Wadsworth Longfellow, Ralph Waldo Emerson, Edgar Allan Poe

Minor Romantic poets

Brazil: Laurindo Rabelo, Sousândrade, José Bonifácio the Young, Aureliano Lessa, João Cardoso de Meneses e Sousa, Manuel de Araújo Porto-alegre
France: Gérard de Nerval, Leconte de Lisle, Aloysius Bertrand, Philothée O'Neddy (born: Théophile Dondey de Santeny)
Georgia: Grigol Orbeliani, Vakhtang Orbeliani
Germany: Gottfried August Bürger, Ludwig Tieck
Hungary: Mihály Vörösmarty
Iceland: Jónas Hallgrímsson
Italy: Silvio Pellico
Norway: Henrik Arnold Wergeland, Johan Sebastian Cammermeyer Welhaven
Pakistan: Jaun Elia, Parveen Shakir, Mohsin Naqvi
Poland: Kornel Ujejski, Antoni Malczewski, Tomasz Zan, Wincenty Pol, Seweryn Goszczyński, Władysław Syrokomla, Kazimierz Brodziński, Józef Ignacy Kraszewski, Aleksander Fredro
Portugal: Almeida Garrett, Alexandre Herculano
Russia: Anton Delvig, Wilhelm Küchelbecker, Nikolay Gnedich
Serbia: Sima Milutinović Sarajlija
Slovakia: Andrej Sládkovič
Spain: Mariano José de Larra, Ramón de Campoamor
Sweden: Erik Johan Stagnelius
United States: William Cullen Bryant, Joseph Rodman Drake, John Greenleaf Whittier, Oliver Wendell Holmes, Sr., George Sterling, John Neal

Romantic poets
Romantic